Apachekolos tenuipes is a species of robber flies in the family Asilidae.

References

Further reading

 Diptera.info
 NCBI Taxonomy Browser, Apachekolos tenuipes
 

Asilidae